Hotel Eastlund is a hotel in Portland, Oregon's Lloyd District, in the United States. The building opened as the Cosmopolitan Motor Hotel in 1962. Following a remodel, Hotel Eastlund began operating in 2015. The restaurant Altabira City Tavern was located in the hotel until 2020.

References

External links

 

1962 establishments in Oregon
Hotel buildings completed in 1962
Hotels in Portland, Oregon
Lloyd District, Portland, Oregon
Northeast Portland, Oregon